El Sonido Nuevo, subtitled/translated The New Soul Sound, is an album by Latin jazz vibraphonist Cal Tjader and pianist Eddie Palmieri recorded in 1966 and released on the Verve label.

Reception

The Allmusic review by Scott Yanow stated, "El Sonido Nuevo is a popular collaboration between vibraphonist Cal Tjader and pianist Eddie Palmieri (who provided the arrangements). Despite the claims of greatness expressed in the liners ("a landmark in the history of Latin jazz"), much of the music is actually quite lightweight although enjoyable enough, and the easy listening melodies and accessible rhythms hold one's interest".

Track listing
All compositions by Cal Tjader and Eddie Palmieri except where noted
 "Los Jibaros" (Ray Rivera, Vin Roddie) - 2:40
 "Gaujira en Azul" - 3:20
 "Ritmo Uni" (Palmieri, Jose Rodriguez) - 3:45
 "Picadillo" (Tito Puente) - 7:00
 "Modesty ("Modesty Blaise" Theme)" (John Dankworth, Benny Green) - 2:30
 "Unidos" - 4:35
 "On a Clear Day (You Can See Forever)" (Burton Lane, Alan Jay Lerner) - 1:50
 "El Sonido Nuevo" - 5:50  
Recorded at Van Gelder Studio in Englewood Cliffs, NJ on May 24, 1966 (tracks 3 & 4), May 25, 1966 (tracks 2 & 7) and May 26, 1966,(tracks 1, 5, 6 & 8)

Personnel
Cal Tjader - vibraphone
Eddie Palmieri - piano, arranger
Julian Priester, Jose Rodriguez, Mark Weinstein - trombone
Barry Rogers - trombone, congas
George Castro - flute, percussion
Bobby Rodriguez- bass
Tommy Lopez, Manny Oquendo - drums
Ismael Quintana - percussion

References

Verve Records albums
Cal Tjader albums
Eddie Palmieri albums
1966 albums
Albums produced by Creed Taylor
Albums recorded at Van Gelder Studio